"This was their finest hour" was a speech delivered by Winston Churchill to the House of Commons of the United Kingdom on 18 June 1940, just over a month after he took over as Prime Minister at the head of an all-party coalition government.

It was the third of three speeches which he gave during the period of the Battle of France, after the "Blood, toil, tears and sweat" speech of 13 May and the "We shall fight on the beaches" speech of 4 June. "This was their finest hour" was made after France had sought an armistice on the evening of 16 June.

Message
In his speech, Churchill justified the low level of support it had been possible to give to France since the Dunkirk evacuation, and reported the successful evacuation of most of the supporting forces. He resisted pressure to purge the coalition of appeasers, or otherwise indulge in recrimination. He reviewed the forces still available to prevent or repel any attempted invasion, summing up the review as follows:

I have thought it right upon this occasion to give the House and the country some indication of the solid, practical grounds upon which we base our inflexible resolve to continue the war, and I can assure them that our professional advisers of the three Services unitedly advise that we should do so, and that there are good and reasonable hopes of final victory. 

He reported messages of support from the Dominions and justified confidence in victory, even if it was not yet clear how that victory could be achieved.

In casting up this dread balance-sheet, contemplating our dangers with a disillusioned eye, I see great reason for intense vigilance and exertion, but none whatever for panic or despair. During the first four years of the last war the Allies experienced,...nothing but disaster and disappointment, and yet at the end their morale was higher than that of the Germans, who had moved from one aggressive triumph to another. During that war we repeatedly asked ourselves the question, "How are we going to win?" and no one was able ever to answer it with much precision, until at the end, quite suddenly, quite unexpectedly, our terrible foe collapsed before us.

Peroration
The peroration, even at a moment of great apparent danger to British national survival, talks not only of national survival and national interest but also of noble causes (freedom, Christian civilisation and the rights of small nations) for which Britain was fighting and for which Churchill thought the United States should and eventually would fight. The War Illustrated published the speech with the title "'If the Empire lasts a thousand years men will say, this was their finest hour'".

Preparation and delivery
The speech was delivered to the Commons at 3:49 pm, and lasted 36 minutes. Churchill, as was his habit, made revisions to his 23-page typescript right up to and during the speech. The final passage of his typescript was laid out in blank verse format, which Churchill scholars consider reflective of the influence of the Psalms on his oratory style.

See also
 Appeal of 18 June – another famous speech given the same day by Charles de Gaulle
 Never was so much owed by so many to so few
 The Darkest Hour
 Timeline of the United Kingdom home front during World War II

Notes

References

External links
 Hansard record of speech
 The Churchill Centre: Their Finest Hour
 Link to audio file of the speech

1940 in the United Kingdom
World War II speeches
English phrases
British political phrases
Quotations from military
Speeches by Winston Churchill
June 1940 events
1940 speeches
1940s neologisms